FESC University (officially in Spanish: Fundación de Estudios Superiores Comfanorte, «Comfanorte Higher Studies Foundation») commonly known simply as FESC, is a private Colombian university with the legal form of foundation, with a high level of development and forged for the benefit of the formation of the people of Norte de Santander and the Colombian people, subject to inspection and monitoring by Law 1740 of 2014 and Law 30 of 1992 of the Ministry of Education of Colombia. Its headquarters are located in the city of Cúcuta, Norte de Santander and has a headquarters in the municipality of Ocaña. It was founded on 25 August 1993, but began its academic activities on 1 August 1995.

Its main headquarters has a modern campus equipped with infrastructures for academic life, in addition to being the headquarters of various research groups. It also has multiple agreements, alliances and institutional networks with national higher education centres and universities. Just as it has several inter-institutional agreements with universities in Mexico, Argentina, Netherlands, Spain, Brazil, China, among other countries. Given its growth, the institution offers 8 undergraduate programs, 44 diploma programs, 2 specializations and 7 master's degrees, for a total of 61 academic programs.

History 
The FESC was founded on August 25, 1993, by the Family Compensation Fund of Norte de Santander (Comfanorte, for its acronym in Spanish), which at the time headed by its administrative director, Dr Moisés Sanjuán López, had the objective of providing added value to their direct beneficiaries and their family group, thus fulfilling the social functions for which the family compensation funds were created.

From there, the creation of the university marks a special moment for the consolidation of the department of Norte de Santander by generating a new dynamic in various aspects of the life of the city. From an institutional point of view, the academy is a decentralized and independent entity. It is organized as an autonomous university entity with a special regime, linked to the Ministry of Education of Colombia in terms of policies and planning of the education sector and in relation to the National Science and Technology System.

Symbols 
Logo
It is the main element of the institutional image. It consists of typography, adopting the initials of the institution (FESC) and at the bottom is the full name of the institution; in addition to having the Comfanorte logo.

Colors
The colors that represent the FESC are grey and red. These colors are used because according to Max Lüscher, gray represents neutrality, in addition to providing brilliance, luxury and elegance. While red, according to Lüscher, is linked to the principle of life and symbolizes value. According to him, it is the expression of the vital force, it is impulse to cause effects and achieve success.

Mascots
The FESC has two mascots: Ringo, a dog that roams the main campus from a puppy. The students adopted him and made him an icon. Terry, a young university tiger who was created in a contest held by the School of Art and Design to determine which would be the new digital mascot of the FESC.

Infrastructure 

The institution has two campuses where academic activity takes place: the main campus (Av 5 15–27, Centro) located in the city of Cúcuta and the campus located in the municipality of Ocaña (Kdx 194–785, Vía Universitaria).

Most faculties operate on the main campus, in addition to the institution's research centers, development centers, and auditoriums. On the other hand, some faculties operate on the Ocaña Campus, in addition to serving as an internship site for various academic programs. For the practice of various sports, the institution has the facilities of the Comfanorte College, establishment of its property located in the neighboring municipality of Los Patios.

Cúcuta
 Main Campus: It is located in the city of Cúcuta, in the direction Av 5 # 15–27, Centro. This modern campus houses blocks of classrooms, offices and laboratories for the realization of the academic and sports activities of its students. In addition, inside is the Moisés Sanjuán López Library, the auditoriums Eduardo Assaf Elcure and Quinta Avenida, the financial laboratory, among others. It is divided into two blocks: the administrative block "Pedro Francisco Silva Mantilla" (A and B) and the block Quinta Avenida “Laboratorio de Ideas” (C).
 Comfanorte College: It is located in the municipality of Los Patios, in the direction km 3 Vía La Floresta.

Ocaña
 Campus Ocaña: It is located in the municipality of Ocaña, in the direction of Kdx 194–785, Vía Universitaria.

Academics

References

External links 
 Official University Website 

Universities and colleges in Colombia
Private universities and colleges in Colombia
Educational institutions established in 1995
Cúcuta
Buildings and structures in Norte de Santander Department
1995 establishments in Colombia